Unaussprechlichen Kulten is a fictional grimoire in the Cthulhu mythos.

Unaussprechlichen Kulten may also mean:

 "Von Unaussprechlichen Kulten", a song by the death metal band Nile